Franklin Springs is a hamlet in Oneida County, New York, United States. Franklin Springs has a post office with ZIP code 13341.

References

Hamlets in Oneida County, New York
Hamlets in New York (state)